Patna Jn.–Lokmanya Tilak Terminus Janta Express is a passenger express train of the Indian Railways connecting Patna Jn. in Patna, Bihar and   in Mumbai, Maharashtra. It is currently being operated with 13201/13202 train numbers on a daily basis.

Service

It averages 48 km/hr as 13201 Patna Jn.–Lokmanya Tilak Terminus Janta Express and covers 1690 km in 35 hrs 35 mins & 24 km/hr as 13202 Lokmanya Tilak Terminus–Patna Jn. Janta Express and covers 1690 km in 35 hrs 15 mins.

Route and halts 

 
 
 
 
 
 
 
 
 
 
Shankargarh
Dabhaura

Coach composition

The train consists of 21 coaches:
 2 AC II Tier
 4 AC III Tier
 11 Sleeper coaches
 2 General
 2 Second-class Luggage/parcel van
 1 pantry car

Traction

From Prayagraj Cheoki Junction the train is pulled by WDP-4D or WDM-3A or WDM-3D or WDP-4B diesel locomotive of Itarsi Diesel Loco Shed until . From Itarsi Junction the train is pulled by WAP-4 electric locomotive of Itarsi Electric Loco Shed until .

See also

References 
13201/Rajendra Nagar Patna - Mumbai LTT Janta Express India Rail Info
13202/Mumbai LTT - Rajendra Nagar Patna Janta Express India Rail Info

Transport in Mumbai
Transport in Patna
Railway services introduced in 1998
Rail transport in Bihar
Rail transport in Madhya Pradesh
Rail transport in Maharashtra
Rail transport in Uttar Pradesh
Express trains in India
Named passenger trains of India